Cruliviridae is a family of virus in the order of Bunyavirales. Unlike other families in the order, this family is unique in the sense that it is only used to contain crustacean-infecting bunyaviruses.

Viruses 
There have been numerous bunya-like viruses proposed to infect crustaceans such as Crab Haemocytic virus, Roscoff virus, and Mourilyan virus. Only three, Lincruvirus europense, Lincruvirus sinense, and Lincruvirus wenlingense, have been accepted by ICTV.

References 

Virus families
RNA viruses
Bunyavirales